
San Jorge Lake is a lake in the Guarayos Province/Marbán Province, Beni Department, Bolivia. At an elevation of 160 m, its surface area is 68.6 km².

Lakes of Beni Department
Lakes of Santa Cruz Department (Bolivia)